Vela Ramamoorthy is a Tamil writer and actor who has appeared in Tamil language films.

Career
Ramamoorthy is a PUC Graduate. He joined the Indian Army and served for five years before being posted in Post office. Since he is a writer, many people would come to meet him in his office.

Ramamoorthy has written acclaimed Tamil novels including Kuttra Parambarai, Kuruthi Aattam, Pattathu Yaanai and is considered one of the leading Tamil story writers of his time. He was also involved in the dispute regarding the rights of making a film out of Kuttra Parambarai and had supported Bala's project ahead of Bharathiraja's. He has also written the book Vela Ramamoorthy Kathaikal which is a compilation of short stories.

Filmography

Web series

References

Living people
Male actors in Tamil cinema
21st-century Indian male actors
Indian male film actors
Tamil male actors
20th-century Indian novelists
21st-century Indian novelists
Indian male novelists
Indian male essayists
Indian male short story writers
Tamil-language writers
Tamil writers
People from Ramanathapuram district
Novelists from Tamil Nadu
Male actors from Tamaulipas
20th-century Indian male writers
21st-century Indian male writers
Year of birth missing (living people)